These are the books of the Vulgate along with the names and numbers given them in the Douay–Rheims Bible and King James Bible. There are 76 books in the Clementine edition of the Latin Vulgate, 46 in the Old Testament, 27 in the New Testament, and 3 in the Apocrypha.

Notes

The names and numbers of the books of the Latin Vulgate differ in ways that may be confusing to many modern Bible readers. In addition, some of the books of the Vulgate have content that has been removed to separate books entirely in many modern Bible translations. This list is an aid to tracking down the content of a Vulgate reference.

The Psalms of the Vulgate follow the numbering assigned to them in the Septuagint which differs from the numbering found in the King James Bible, though not in the order nor the content. See Psalms for more details.

Note that the Apocrypha and Old Testament divisions of the Vulgate do not exactly correspond to those sections in the King James Bible. The Vulgate's Apocrypha section is smaller than the King James Bible's, with a correspondingly larger Old Testament. See the article on the biblical canon for details as to why this is so. The names of those books found in the Apocrypha section of their respective versions are in italics.

A complement to this list can be found at List of books of the King James Version.

Old Testament

New Testament

Apocrypha

Other editions
The list is for the Clementine Vulgate. Other editions of the Vulgate vary in the Apocrypha, in the order of the books, and in the names of the books.

 The Gutenberg Bible mixes the apocrypha into the Old Testament, with the Prayer of Manasses following 2 Paralipomenon, and 3 and 4 Esdras following 1 Esdras and Nehemias. The Prayer of Solomon follows Ecclesiasticus. It thus has 50 books in the Old Testament and 27 in the New, for a total of 77 books.
 The New Vulgate changes the name of Ecclesiasticus to Liber Siracidae; Tobiae is called Thobis. Although the New Vulgate contains the deuterocanonical books, it omits the three apocrypha entirely. It thus has a total of only 73 books.
 The Stuttgart Vulgate adds Psalm 151 and the pseudepigraphal Epistle to the Laodiceans to the Apocrypha. It thus has 5 books in the Apocrypha, 46 in the Old Testament, and 27 in the New, for a total of 78 books. The spelling of proper names in this edition is irregular and inconsistent, so the names of many of the books were altered, e.g. Naum for Nahum.

Early manuscripts
The early Vulgate manuscripts essentially had a table of contents identical to those found in modern Vulgate editions.

Sequence of Books in Vulgate Old Testaments 

Adapted from Richard Marsden's The Text of the Old Testament in Anglo-Saxon England, page 450.

 Oct = Genesis, Exodus, Leviticus, Numbers, Deuteronomy, Joshua, Judges, Ruth (the "Octateuch")
 Kgs = 1 Samuel, 2 Samuel, 1 Kings, 2 Kings
 Min Pr = Hosea, Joel, Amos, Obadiah, Jonah, Michah, Nahum, Habakkuk, Zephaniah, Haggai, Zecheriah, Malachi
 Jer = Jeremiah, Lamentations
 Song = Song of Solomon
 Chron = 1 Chronicles, 2 Chronicles
 Ezr + N = Ezra, Nehemiah
 Sir = Ecclesiasticus
 Macc = 1 Maccabees, 2 Maccabees
 Jer + Bar = Jeremiah, Lamentations, Baruch, Letter of Jeremiah
 Chron + Pm = 1 Chronicles, 2 Chronicles, Prayer of Manasses.
 Esdr = 1 Esdras  = (Vulgate) 3 Esdras = (Septuagint) Esdras A

In the Old Testament sequence set out by Jerome in the Prologus Galeatus, he identifies the books into four categories: The Law (the five books of Moses), the Prophets (including Joshua, Judges and Kings, as well as the major and minor prophets), the Writings (including both Poetical and Wisdom books as well as narrative books), and finally the five apocryphal books of Wisdom, Ecclesiasticus, Judith, Tobit and Maccabees. Jerome's first three categories correspond to the rabbinic ordering of the Hebrew Bible, except that Jerome includes Ruth with Judges, and Lamentations with Jeremiah. Although the prologus, and hence Jerome's listing, was included in almost all Vulgate pandect manuscripts, his order was only rarely adopted; the exceptions being the bibles produced by Theodulf and his successors at Fleury, and also the 9th century Codex Toletanus in Spain.

An alternative listing of the Old Testament books, which circulated universally in the Latin west, was that set out by Augustine (On Christian Doctrine, II, viii, 13). Augustine allocates the Old Testament into five categories: the Law (as in Jerome), the History (including the books of Chronicles), the Narratives (including Tobit, Judith and Maccabees from the apocryphal books), the books of David and Solomon (including the apocryphal books of Wisdom and Ecclesiasticus), and the Prophets (including Daniel with the major prophets). Although Augustine's detailed order of books has not been recorded in any manuscript, most subsequent pandects recognised his categories. Augustine's categories are also found in the decrees of the Council of Carthage (418), at which Augustine was present, in the order: Law, History, David and Solomon (including Job), Prophets, Narratives; and this order is also found the 8th century Codex Cavensis and other Spanish pandect bibles.

The Codex Amiatinus sets out the Old Testament in the order: Law, History, David and Solomon, Prophets, Narratives. Alcuin gives the order: Law, History, Prophets, David and Solomon, Narratives; Alcuin removes Job from the Narrative section to a position immediately preceding the Book of Psalms, and also includes Chronicles with the Narratives (in both cases returning to Jerome's order). The Paris bibles followed the sequence: Law, History, Narratives (now including 3 Esdras), David and Solomon, Prophets (now including Baruch with Jeremiah), and Maccabees is the final book. The Paris order, minus 3 Esdras, was eventually to be adopted by the Clementine Vulgate.

See also 

 List of books of the King James Version

References

Further reading
Timeline of Jerome's translations.

Vulgate
Vulgate